Purpurmond (in English, Purple Moon) was the 6th studio album by Münchener Freiheit in their native language, reaching #17 in the German charts.  Three minor hit singles were released from the album, the most successful being the lead-off single Verlieben verlieren.  The album's promotional tour was later chronicled on the double CD/video Freiheit Live (1990).

Most tracks from the album were re-recorded in English and released in 1990 as the album Love is No Science.

Track listing
 Verlieben verlieren 4:10
 Die unsichtbare welt 4:00
 Stell dir vor 3:14
 In der Mitte dieser Nacht 3:54
 Ihr kommt zu spät 4:21
 Laß mich nie mehr los 3:34
 Wo du bist 3:56
 Ich will dich nochmal 4:12
 Purpurmond 3:56
 Wenn ein Stern vom Himmel fällt 4:49
 Was ich fand 3:31
 Verlieben verlieren (rhythm remix) 4:16 (CD versions only)

All music and lyrics by Stefan Zauner and Aron Strobel

Personnel
 Stefan Zauner - Vocals
 Aron Strobel - Guitars
 Michael Kunzi - Bass
 Alex Grünwald - Keyboards
 Rennie Hatzke - Drums

Produced by Armand Volker

1989 albums
Münchener Freiheit albums
CBS Records albums